This timeline of the Big Bang shows a sequence of events as currently theorized by scientists. 

It is a logarithmic scale that shows  second instead of second. To convert −30 read on the scale to second calculate  second = one millisecond. On a logarithmic time scale a step lasts ten times longer than the previous step.

See also 
 Graphical timeline from Big Bang to Heat Death
 Graphical timeline of the Stelliferous Era
 Graphical timeline of the universe
 Cosmic Calendar (age of the universe scaled to a single year)
 Detailed logarithmic timeline

References 
 

Astronomy timelines
Astrophysics
Big Bang
Big Bang
Physical cosmology